The 1969 All-Ireland Senior Club Camogie Championship for the leading clubs in the women's team field sport of camogie was won by St Paul’s from Kilkenny, who defeated Ahane from Limerick in the final, played at Castleconnell.

Arrangements
The championship was organised on the traditional provincial system used in Gaelic Games since the 1880s, with Oranmore and Ahoghill winning the championships of the other two provinces. Ahoghill had a great start to their semi-final with goals from a Moya Forde 30-yard free, another hand-passed goal from Lily Scullion until Ahane took control with goals from Joan Hayes and Marjorie Doohan.

The Final
Ann Carroll’s shot seven of her team’s ten points for St Paul’s against Ahane in the final. She won club medals with both St Patrick's Glengoole and St Paul’s Agnes Hourigan wrote in the Irish Press: The vital difference was the team-work and experience of the Kilkenny girls and their far greater aptitude for taking their chances. This was typified by the way Anne Carroll had six Kilkenny points from frees and placed balls, wonderful accuracy under the conditions. For nine of the St Paul’s side, this was their second All Ireland club title in succession. Anne Carroll further enhanced her almost unbelievable record in this competition by winning her fourth club championship medal in five seasons.

Provincial stages

Final stages

References

External links
 Camogie Association

1969 in camogie
1969